Toy is a Chinese, English, and Turkish surname.

Origins
As an English surname, Toy originated in two or three different ways. First, it was a nickname, either from Middle English  "trifling thing; play, sport", or from Middle French  "sheath". Second, it was a relational name, from the given name Toye (whose origin is not clear). Finally, it may have been a toponymic surname referring to a former settlement probably located in the East Riding of Yorkshire. Early records of the English surname Toy include a Robert Toy of Gainford in the patent rolls for 1339.

As a Chinese surname, Toy is a spelling, based on the pronunciation in different varieties of Chinese, of the following Chinese surnames, listed by their spelling in Hanyu Pinyin, which reflects the Standard Mandarin pronunciation:
Cài, spelled Toy based on its Taishanese pronunciation. This is a toponymic surname referring to the state of Cai, adopted as a surname by some people of the state after its conquest by the state of Chu during China's Warring States period.
Tái, spelled Toy based on its mainstream Cantonese pronunciation. According to the Shuowen Jiezi, the surname Tái originated as a toponymic surname referring to the city by the same name in modern-day Shaanxi.

Toy is also a Turkish surname, from  "bustard".

Statistics
According to statistics compiled by Patrick Hanks on the basis of the 2011 United Kingdom Census and the Census of Ireland 2011, there were 895 people on the island of Great Britain and five on the island of Ireland with the surname Toy as of 2011. The 1881 United Kingdom census found 1,095 people with the surname Toy in various places in England and Scotland, particularly in Cornwall.

The 2010 United States Census found 5,784 people with the surname Toy, making it the 5,951st-most-common name in the country. This represented a slight increase from 5,730 people (5,567th-most-common) in the 2000 Census. In both censuses, roughly six-tenths of the bearers of the surname identified as non-Hispanic white, and slightly more than one quarter as Asian. It was the 616th-most-common surname among respondents to the 2000 Census who identified as Asian.

People
 Barbara Toy (1908–2001), British writer
 Barry Toy (born 1939), Australian rules footballer
 Camden Toy (contemporary), American actor and script writer
 Carole Toy (1948–2014), Australian archer
 Crawford Howell Toy (1836–1919), American Hebrew scholar
 Emily Toy (born ), English amateur golfer
 Erol Toy (1936–2021), Turkish writer
 Frederick E. Toy (1860s–1933), US Army soldier and recipient of the Medal of Honor
 Harry S. Toy (1892–1955), Michigan Attorney General and Michigan Supreme Court justice
 Hasan Toy (born 1994), Turkish kickboxer
 Humphrey Toy (1537–1577), British bookseller and publisher
 James C. Toy (1836–1889), American Civil War soldier and Virginia politician
 Jim Toy (born 1930), American LGBT activist
 Jim Toy (baseball) (1858–1919), Native American baseball player
 Josh Toy (born 1992), Australian rules footballer
 Julie Furuta-Toy (born 1960), American diplomat
 Laura M. Toy (born 1951), American politician in Michigan
 Mark Toy, United States Army major general
 Metin Toy (born 1994), Turkish volleyball player
 Noel Toy (birth name Ngum Yee Hom; 1918–2003), American burlesque performer
 Richard Toy (1911–1995), New Zealand architect 
 Sam Toy (1923–2008), British industrialist and chairman of Ford Motor Company
 Virginia Toy (born 1979), New Zealand geologist

References

Multiple Chinese surnames
Surnames of English origin
Turkish-language surnames